Rohan Stuart Robinson (born 15 November 1971 in Melbourne, Victoria) is an Australian retired hurdler.

His personal best time was 48.28 seconds, achieved in the 2nd semi-final at the 1996 Olympic Games in Atlanta. This is the current Oceanian record.

Currently the proud owner of his own company Silk Road Projects

International competitions

References

1971 births
Living people
Athletes from Melbourne
Australian male hurdlers
Olympic athletes of Australia
Athletes (track and field) at the 1996 Summer Olympics
Athletes (track and field) at the 2000 Summer Olympics
Commonwealth Games medallists in athletics
Commonwealth Games silver medallists for Australia
Athletes (track and field) at the 1990 Commonwealth Games
Athletes (track and field) at the 1994 Commonwealth Games
Athletes (track and field) at the 1998 Commonwealth Games
World Athletics Championships athletes for Australia
Australian Institute of Sport track and field athletes
Competitors at the 1998 Goodwill Games
Medallists at the 1998 Commonwealth Games